Oktyabrsk is a town in Samara Oblast, Russia, located on the right bank of the Volga River (Saratov Reservoir),  from Samara. Population:

History
It was founded in 1956 by consolidating of three settlements: Batraki, Pravaya Volga and Permomaysky.

Administrative and municipal status
Within the framework of administrative divisions, it is incorporated as the town of oblast significance of Oktyabrsk—an administrative unit with the status equal to that of the districts. As a municipal division, the town of oblast significance of Oktyabrsk is incorporated as Oktyabrsk Urban Okrug.

Transportation
There is a railway station in the town.

References

Notes

Sources

Cities and towns in Samara Oblast
Populated places established in 1956
Syzransky Uyezd